The Bladen Formation is a geologic formation in North Carolina. It is known for a plethora of terrestrial and aquatic Cretaceous fossils, including dinosaurs and mosasaurs.

Dinosaurs known from the formation:

 Ornithomimus sp.
 Dromaeosauridae indet.
 Hadrosauridae indet.
 Tyrannosauridae indet.

See also

 List of dinosaur-bearing rock formations

References

 

Cretaceous geology of North Carolina